Russka is a historical novel by Edward Rutherfurd, published in 1991 by Crown Publishers. It quickly became a New York Times bestseller.

Plot summary
The narrative spans 1,800 years of Russian history. The families that provide the focus for the story are the Bobrovs, Romanovs, Karpenkos, Suvorins and Popovs. The five families span the main ethnic groups and social levels of the society in this northern empire.

Historical characters encountered through the narrative include Genghis Khan, Ivan the Terrible and his secret police, the westernizing Peter the Great, Catherine the Great, and the Bolsheviks of the twentieth century.

The stories of different characters in those families use actual stories of different Russian families. For example, the peasant family that joins the nobility, because of its business, is based on the Stroganovs. The nobleman who is a friend of Ivan IV of Russia and asks his territory to be part of the Oprichnina is also based on a member of the Stroganovs but at a different period.

Publication details
1991, UK, Century,  July 1991, hardback (First edition)
1991, USA, Crown Pub, ? September 1991, hardback
1992, UK, Arrow Books, June 1992, paperback
2005, USA, Ballantine Books, March 2005, paperback
2021, Russian Federation, Азбука-Аттикус, May 2021, hardback

References

1991 British novels
Novels by Edward Rutherfurd
Historical novels
Novels set in Russia
Cultural depictions of Ivan the Terrible
Cultural depictions of Peter the Great
Cultural depictions of Catherine the Great
Hutchinson (publisher) books